Mount Czegka is a mountain,  high, on the east side of Scott Glacier, just north of the terminus of Van Reeth Glacier, in the Queen Maud Mountains. It was discovered in December 1934 by the Byrd Antarctic Expedition geological party under Quin Blackburn, and named by Richard E. Byrd after Victor H. Czegka (1880–1973), CWO, United States Marine Corps, who served as a member with the Byrd Antarctic Expedition, 1928–30, and also as member and supply manager with the Byrd Antarctic Expedition, 1933–35.

See also
 Acarospora Peak - 1 mile (2km) southwest
 Watson Escarpment

References
 

Mountains of Marie Byrd Land